James Nathan Browning (March 13, 1850 – November 9, 1921) was a Texas politician and lawyer. He served as Lieutenant Governor from 1899 – 1903.
He had earlier served as a member of the Texas House of Representatives (1883–89, 1891).
A later Lieutenant Governor, Rick Perry, made the following comments when he was sworn in on January 19, 1999.

One hundred years and two days ago, Governor Joseph Sayers and Lieutenant Governor James Browning came to the 11-year-old Capitol building during one of the coldest winters ever recorded in Texas and took the oath of office. The Texans assembled on that day could not have imagined what the 20th century would bring or the role Texans would play in the most American of centuries.

Browning was born in Clark County, Arkansas, and is buried in Amarillo, Texas.

References

 
 Political Graveyard: James Browning
 Speech by Rick Perry
 List of members of Texas House of Representratives

1850 births
1921 deaths
People from Clark County, Arkansas
People from Cooke County, Texas
People from Shackelford County, Texas
People from Mobeetie, Texas
Texas lawyers
Democratic Party members of the Texas House of Representatives
People from Clarendon, Texas
Politicians from Amarillo, Texas
Lieutenant Governors of Texas
19th-century American lawyers